Public Enemy is a Belgian French-language crime thriller based loosely on the Marc Dutroux case. The 10-part first season aired on La Une in Belgium from 1 May to 29 May 2016, and the series has been renewed for a second season.

Synopsis
A child murderer released on parole, Guy Béranger is welcomed by the monks of the abbey of Vielsart, a quiet little village in the Ardennes. He is placed under the protection of Chloé Muller, a young federal police inspector, convinced that, sooner or later, the former criminal will re offend. While the population is indignant at the presence of Public Enemy No. 1 in their neighbourhood, the police learn of the disturbing disappearance of a young girl from the village ...

Cast and characters
 as Chloe Muller
 as Michaël Charlier
 as Lucas Stassart
 as Guy Béranger
Philippe Jeusette as Patrick Stassart
Laura Sepul as Judith Stassart
 as Vincent Stassart
Eric Godon as Etienne Gomez

Episodes

Season 1 (2017)

Season 2 (2019)

Broadcast
In Belgium, the series first aired on La Une from 1 May to 29 May 2016, where it was watched by an average of 388,000 viewers per episode. It was broadcast again on Canvas from 4 February 2017.

International
In France, the series aired on TF1 from 6 February to 27 February 2017. The series also premiered in Germany on 24 November 2016 on Sky Deutschland, in Australia on 15 December on SBS On Demand and in the UK on 10 May 2017 on Sky Atlantic. The series was also sold to Movistar Series Xtra and VOD in Spain; Ale Kino+ in Poland and C More Entertainment in Sweden, Norway, Finland and Denmark., in Croatia, Bosnia and Herzegovina, Serbia, Montenegro, Slovenia and Macedonia series premiered on Pickbox VOD.

Reception

Critical response
The series received critical acclaim in Belgium. In the UK, The Timess Chris Bennion gave the series four stars out of five, calling it a "decidedly elegant thriller". The Radio Timess Alison Graham described the series as a "workmanlike and actually not-bad thriller, even if there are no surprises".

Accolades
The series won the Buyers' Choice "Coup de Coeur" Award at the MIPTV event in Cannes. Angelo Bison was named the Best Actor in a French-Language Series at the 2016 Series Mania awards. The series also received an honourable mention at the 2016 Prix Europa in Berlin.

Notes
1.This refers to the original date of broadcast on La Une.
2.This refers to the original date of broadcast on TF1.

References

External links

2010s Belgian television series
2016 Belgian television series debuts
French-language television programming in Belgium
Belgian crime television series
Marc Dutroux
La Une original programming
Ardennes in fiction